Qianlabeo striatus is a species of cyprinid fish endemic to the Pearl River drainage, Guizhou, China. It is the only member of its genus.

References
 

Labeoninae
Cyprinid fish of Asia
Freshwater fish of China
Fish described in 2004